Emma Vulin is an Australian politician. She has been a Labor Party member of the Victorian Legislative Assembly since November 2022, representing the seat of Pakenham.

References

Members of the Victorian Legislative Assembly
Australian Labor Party members of the Parliament of Victoria
21st-century Australian women politicians
Living people
Labor Left politicians
Year of birth missing (living people)